The 2012–13 Kennesaw State Owls men's basketball team represented Kennesaw State University during the 2012–13 NCAA Division I men's basketball season. The Owls, led by second year head coach Lewis Preston, played their home games at the KSU Convocation Center and were members of the Atlantic Sun Conference. They finished the season 3–27, 2–16 in A-Sun play to finish in last place. They failed to qualify for the Atlantic Sun Basketball tournament.

Roster

Schedule
 
|-
!colspan=9| Regular season

References

Kennesaw State Owls men's basketball seasons
Kennesaw State